Steven G. Nash (December 13, 1938 – July 5, 1991) was an American Democrat politician.

Nash was born in Chicago, Illinois, where he was educated. He was involved in the real estate management business. He served in the Illinois Senate from 1979 to 1983, and in the Illinois House of Representatives from 1983 to 1987.

He died of a heart attack in Chicago, Illinois.

Notes

1938 births
1991 deaths
Businesspeople from Chicago
Politicians from Chicago
Democratic Party members of the Illinois House of Representatives
Democratic Party Illinois state senators
20th-century American politicians
20th-century American businesspeople